Magüi Serna was the defending champion and successfully defended her title, by defeating qualifier Julia Schruff 6–4, 6–1 in the final.

Seeds

Draw

Finals

Top half

Bottom half

References

External links
 Official results archive (ITF)
 Official results archive (WTA)

2003 Women's Singles
Singles
Estoril Open